Allomethus mysticus is a species of fly in the family Pipunculidae. It was described by Rapp in 1943.

It is endemic to Quebec.

References

Pipunculidae
Insects of Canada
Diptera of North America
Insects described in 1943